Brandt is a Germanic surname and given name.

Geographical distribution
As of 2014, 42.4% of all known bearers of the surname Brandt were residents of Germany (frequency 1:1,108), 30.5% of the United States (1:6,951), 4.5% of South Africa (1:6,959), 3.7% of Brazil (1:32,483), 2.7% of Denmark (1:1,232), 2.7% of Sweden (1:2,162), 1.6% of Canada (1:13,299), 1.3% of the Netherlands (1:7,848), 1.3% of Poland (1:17,678), 1.0% of Namibia (1:1,366).

In Germany, the frequency of the surname was higher than national average (1:1,108) in the following states:
 1. Mecklenburg-Vorpommern (1:348)
 2. Schleswig-Holstein (1:409)
 3. Saxony-Anhalt (1:460)
 4. Lower Saxony (1:573)
 5. Hamburg (1:599)
 6. Bremen (1:623)
 7. Berlin (1:754)
 8. Brandenburg (1:803)
 9. Thuringia (1:1,096)

In Denmark, the frequency of the surname was higher than national average (1:1,232) only in one region: Capital Region of Denmark (1:905)

In Namibia, the frequency of the surname was higher than national average (1:1,366) in the following regions:
 1. ǁKaras Region (1:163)
 2. Kunene Region (1:454)
 3. Omaheke Region (1:700)
 4. Erongo Region (1:709)
 5. Khomas Region (1:899)
 6. Hardap Region (1:942)

In Sweden, the frequency of the surname was higher than national average (1:2,162) in the following counties:
 1. Dalarna County (1:1,266)
 2. Skåne County (1:1,497)
 3. Jönköping County (1:1,638)
 4. Kronoberg County (1:1,876)
 5. Västmanland County (1:1,995)
 6. Stockholm County (1:2,139)

People with the surname

Arts and entertainment 

Augusto Brandt (1892–1942), Venezuelan musician and composer
Betsy Brandt (born 1973), American actress
Bill Brandt (1904–1983), German-British photographer and photojournalist
Carlos Brandt (1875–1964), Venezuelan philosopher, author and naturopath
Di Brandt (born 1952), Canadian poet and literary critic
Eddie Brandt (1920–2011), American composer, writer and store owner
Gerard Brandt (1626–1685), Dutch preacher, playwright, poet, church historian, biographer and naval historian
Helene Brandt (1936–2013), American sculptor
Joe Brandt (1882–1939), American publicist, screenwriter, editor, film producer, and general manager
Józef Brandt (1841–1915), Polish painter best known for his paintings of battles
Kyle Brandt (born 1979), American actor
Mac Brandt, American actor
Marianne Brandt (1893–1983), German painter, sculptor, photographer and designer
Marianne Brandt (contralto) (1842–1921), Austrian opera singer
Max von Brandt (1835–1920), German diplomat and publicist
Miroslav Brandt (1914–2002), Croatian historian
Paul Brandt (born 1972), Canadian country music singer
Peter Andreas Brandt (1792-1862), Norwegian painter and illustrator
Skylar Brandt (born 1993), American ballet dancer
Vassily Brandt (1869–1923), Russian trumpeter, composer and pedagogue

Science and mathematics 

Achi Brandt (born 1938), Israeli mathematician
Arthur William Brandt (1888–1943), American engineer
Eduard Brandt (1839–1891), Russian zoologist and anatomist
Fred Hermann Brandt (1908–1994), German insect collector, botanist, and counter-espionage agent 
Fredric Brandt (1949–2015), American dermatologist
Heinrich Brandt (1886–1954), German mathematician
Georg Brandt (1694–1768), Swedish chemist and mineralogist who discovered cobalt
Johann Friedrich von Brandt (1802–1879), German naturalist
Karl Brandt (zoologist) (1854–1931), German zoologist and marine biologist

Politics 

Andy Brandt (born 1938), Canadian politician
Bernard E. Brandt (1881–1954), American politician
David Brandt (politician), former Chief Minister of Montserrat
Edward R. Brandt (1931–2013), American politician
Helmut Brandt (born 1950), German politician
Michel Brandt (born 1990), German politician
Willy Brandt (1913–1992), German politician

Sports 

 David Brandt (American football) (born 1977), former American football offensive lineman
Ed Brandt (1905–1944), American baseball player
Gil Brandt (born 1933), American football executive
Jackie Brandt (born 1934), American baseball player
Julian Brandt (born 1996), German footballer
Kerstin Brandt (born 1961), East German high jumper

Others 

Charlie Brandt (1957-2004), American serial killer
Edgar Brandt (1880–1960), French ironworker and weapons designer
Francis Frederick Brandt (1819–1874), British barrister and author
Franz Brandt (1893-1954), German World War I flying ace
Heinz Brandt (1907–1944), German army officer and showjumper
Jan Brandt, American entrepreneur
Johanna Brandt (1876–1964), South African propagandist, spy, prophet and writer
Joseph A. Brandt, American university president
Karl Brandt (1904–1948), German Nazi physician and war criminal, executed for war crimes
Karl Brandt (economist) (1899–1975), German-American agricultural economist
Lawrence Eugene Brandt (born 1939), American Roman Catholic prelate
Realf Ottesen Brandt (1859–1927), Lutheran minister
Richard Brandt (1910–1997), American philosopher
Rudolf Brandt (1909–1948), German Nazi SS officer, executed for war crimes
Yakov Brandt (1869–1946), Russian Sinologist-diplomat, philologist and professor

People with the given name 
Brandt Hershman, American politician
Brandt C. Louie (born 1943), Canadian businessman
Brandt Jobe (born 1965), American golfer
Brandt Snedeker (born 1980), American golfer

See also 
Brant (surname)
Brand (surname)

References

German-language surnames
Ashkenazi surnames
Russian Mennonite surnames